Lilia Pogolșa (born 1 April 1963) is a Moldovan politician. She served as Minister of Education, Culture and Research from 9 November 2020 to 23 December 2020 in the cabinet of Prime Minister Ion Chicu. She also served in this position until 5 August 2021 with Aureliu Ciocoi as Acting Prime Minister.

References 

Living people
1963 births
Place of birth missing (living people)
21st-century Moldovan politicians
Women government ministers of Moldova
21st-century Moldovan women politicians